The 2005/06 FIS Ski Jumping Continental Cup was the 15th in a row (13th official) Continental Cup winter season and the 4th summer season in ski jumping for men. This was also the 2nd winter season for ladies. 

Other competitive circuits this season included the World Cup and Grand Prix.

Men

Summer

Winter

Ladies

Winter

Team winter

Men's standings

Summer

Winter

Ladies' standings

Winter

Europa Cup vs. Continental Cup 
This was originally last Europa Cup season and is also recognized as the first Continental Cup season by International Ski Federation although under this name began its first official season in 1993/94.

References

FIS Ski Jumping Continental Cup
2005 in ski jumping
2006 in ski jumping